Ohio's 26th senatorial district has always been based in northern central Ohio, and currently comprises the counties of Sandusky, Seneca, Wyandot, Crawford, Morrow, Marion and Union. It encompasses Ohio House districts 86, 87 and 88.  It has a Cook PVI of R+7.  Its current Ohio Senator is Republican Bill Reineke.

List of senators

External links
Ohio's 26th district senator at the 130th Ohio General Assembly official website

Ohio State Senate districts